Vashlovani National Park is a national park located in the eastern part of Georgia, and was established in 1935 to preserve its unique shallow forests.

Vashlovani State Reserve is notable for its unique, badland-like areas of desert and semi-desert steppe vegetation and arid and deciduous forests. It is also home to the great canyon cliffs, known in the area as the "Sharp Walls", and the magnificent Alazani flood plains and forests.

Flora and fauna 
Special features include the occurrence of wild pistachio trees, peonies and various types of orchids in addition to some endemic plant species. The fauna includes 25 species of reptiles, including species such as Macrovipera lebetina and Eryx jaculus.  Among more than 100 native bird species are the imperial eagle, black vulture, pheasant and the rare black stork. The 46 mammal species include golden jackals, red foxes, wolves, Eurasian lynxes, brown bears, jungle cats and porcupines.
In 2003, for the first time the track of a Caucasian leopard was discovered; the following year, a leopard in the national park area was recorded for the first time with a camera trap.

See also 
Vashlovani Strict Nature Reserve

References 

National parks of Georgia (country)
Protected areas established in 1935
Geography of Kakheti
Tourist attractions in Kakheti